James Ignatius O'Rourke McMahon  (born 7 July 1980) is a British politician serving as Shadow Secretary of State for Environment, Food and Rural Affairs since 2021. He has been the Member of Parliament (MP) for Oldham West and Royton since 2015 under the Labour and Co-operative banner. 

McMahon was a councillor from 2003 to 2017 and served as Leader of Oldham Metropolitan Borough Council from 2011 to 2016. He also sits on the National Executive Committee on behalf of the shadow frontbench. McMahon became Chair of the Co-operative Party in October 2020. He was Shadow Secretary of State for Transport from 2020 to 2021.

Early life and education
McMahon was born in Miles Platting, Manchester, to William McMahon, a lorry driver and Alicia O'Rourke (Breffni). The family moved from Cheetham Hill when he was a child to Middleton, where he attended secondary school. He left school at the age of sixteen.

Professional career
McMahon started work in 1997 as an apprentice technician at Manchester University, rising to become a senior technician before leaving in 2004. He then joined local government service as a regeneration officer and latterly as a town centre manager.

Political career

Local government

McMahon was first elected as a Member of Oldham Metropolitan Borough Council for Failsworth East in a by-election on 20 November 2003. He held various posts on Oldham Council before becoming the council's Labour group leader in 2008 after the Liberal Democrats won control of the authority. At the 2011 local elections, Labour re-gained control of the council and McMahon became its leader. As council leader McMahon sat as one of the 11 members of the Greater Manchester Combined Authority with responsibility for transport.

McMahon was the inaugural chairman of the Co-operative Council Innovation Network and served as the Labour leader of the Local Government Association. McMahon was named the 6th most influential person in local government by The Local Government Chronicle ahead of senior government ministers.

In August 2014, McMahon was elected to represent Labour councillors on the party's National Executive Committee (NEC).

In the 2015 Labour leadership election, McMahon was reported to have supported Liz Kendall's leadership bid. Kendall finished in last place out of the four candidates (Jeremy Corbyn won, followed next by Andy Burnham and Yvette Cooper), receiving less than 5% of the vote.

In 2016, McMahon stood down as council leader and was replaced by his Deputy, Jean Stretton. He resigned his council seat in 2017, triggering a by-election on 16 February 2017.

Parliament
McMahon won the selection to be Labour Party candidate at the 2015 Oldham West and Royton by-election following the death of incumbent Michael Meacher. At the by-election held on 3 December 2015, McMahon was elected Member of Parliament for Oldham West and Royton, with 62% of the vote – an increase of seven percentage points since the 2015 general election. At the by-election McMahon represented just the Labour Party rather than his later Labour and Co-operative Party affiliation.

He served as Parliamentary Private Secretary to the Deputy Leader of the Labour Party until being appointed to serve as Shadow Minister for Local Government and Devolution. He supported Owen Smith in the failed attempt to replace Jeremy Corbyn in the 2016 Labour Party leadership election.

After Keir Starmer's election as Leader of the Labour Party, McMahon was appointed Shadow Secretary of State for Transport. On 29 November 2021 he was reshuffled to the role of shadow secretary of state for environment, food and rural affairs.

Votes at 16 
On being selected to present a Private Members Bill, McMahon moved the Representation of the People (Young People's Enfranchisement and Education) Bill 2017–19, which sought to extend the franchise across the United Kingdom to eligible voters aged 16 and 17. The Bill included measures to introduce citizenship and the constitution education in schools.

The Bill was supported by MPs from all political parties represented in the House of Commons, with the exception of the DUP, with its supporters including then Labour Party Leader Jeremy Corbyn, then Labour Deputy Leader Tom Watson, Conservative Party MP Peter Bottomley, then Liberal Democrat Deputy Leader Jo Swinson, and Green Party MP Caroline Lucas.

The Bill received its Second Reading in November 2017, but did not progress any further. It led to the establishment of the cross party All Party Parliamentary Group on Votes at 16.

Personal life
McMahon lives with Charlene Duerden in Failsworth. They have two children.

Honours and distinctions
In February 2014, McMahon was named "Council Leader of the Year" during the Councillor Achievement Awards hosted by the Local Government Information Unit. He was credited with leading improvements in Oldham Metropolitan Borough Council having redesignated it as a Co-operative Council. Also in 2014, University Centre Oldham conferred upon him Honorary Fellowship, as well as being elected a Fellow of the Royal Society of Arts (FRSA).

McMahon was appointed Officer of the Order of the British Empire (OBE) in the 2015 Birthday Honours for "services to the community in Oldham", and was invested by Charles, Prince of Wales, on 18 December 2015.

In November 2017, he was named as the Youth Voice Champion by the British Youth Council following his work on the Votes at 16 campaign.

References

External links

1980 births
Living people
Councillors in Greater Manchester
English people of Irish descent
Labour Party (UK) councillors
Labour Co-operative MPs for English constituencies
Members of the Fabian Society
Officers of the Order of the British Empire
People from Miles Platting
UK MPs 2015–2017
UK MPs 2017–2019
UK MPs 2019–present
Leaders of local authorities of England
Members of the Greater Manchester Combined Authority